This is a list of countries by motor vehicle production in the 2000s based on Organisation Internationale des Constructeurs d'Automobiles (OICA).

Figures include passenger cars, light commercial vehicles, minibuses, trucks, buses and coaches.

2002 

Reference: http://www.oica.net/category/production-statistics/2002-statistics/

2003 

Reference:

2004

2005

2006

2007

2008

2009

See also 
 2000s in economics
 List of countries by motor vehicle production in the 2010s
 List of countries by motor vehicle production
 List of manufacturers by motor vehicle production

2000s economic history